Kozya Sloboda is a station on the Kazan Metro that opened on 30 December 2010. It is the first station on the right bank of the Kazanka River. Construction on the station started in February 2006.

The station was set to be called Käcä Bistäse or Kozya Sloboda, but in the wake of protests led in part by students of Kazan State Energy University the city government settled on the purely descriptive name Aq Bars. The previous name, which translates roughly as Goat Settlement, was a traditional name for the region before it became a part of Kazan. Due to citizens' protests and online voting, however, the name was switched back to Kozya Sloboda. Other candidate names included Energouniversitet (Energy University) and Zarechye (Beyond the River Area).

References

Kazan Metro
Railway stations in Russia opened in 2010
Railway stations located underground in Russia